Floyd Casey Stadium was a stadium in Waco, Texas. The stadium was used for 64 seasons before being replaced by McLane Stadium in 2014.  It was primarily used for football, and was the home field of the Baylor Bears. The stadium, located about four miles from the Baylor University campus, cost $1.8 million to build and sat 50,000 people. Originally named Baylor Stadium, it opened in 1950 with a Baylor game against the Houston Cougars. On December 7, 2013, Baylor played its last game in the stadium, against the Texas Longhorns, where the attendance record of 51,728 was established. Baylor won 19 of its final 20 games played at the stadium.

Originally known as Baylor Stadium, the stadium was renamed at halftime of the November 5, 1988 homecoming game when it was renamed for Floyd Casey by his son, university trustee and longtime booster Carl B. Casey of Dallas, who gave US$5 million towards an $8 million stadium renovation project.

The stadium was renovated several times. Turf was first introduced to the stadium in 1972. Then in 1998, the stadium installed SportGrass, a leading artificial grass surface. In 2005, it underwent massive renovations to extend the Grant Teaff Plaza in honor of former head coach Grant Teaff. The extended plaza created much-needed updates to the stadium's façade.

The stadium was an elongated oval shape, running southeast-northwest, with large grandstands on the sidelines.  The south end zone was cleared, with athletic marks painted on the ground and the large LED scoreboard behind it. (Prior to the creation of the current athletic marks, the area was painted gold, with "BAYLOR" painted in large green block letters.)  In 2004, a large tarp was installed that covered the south end zone and could be removed when ticket demand necessitated it.  With the tarp in place seating capacity was reduced to 47,000. The north end zone had seating in front of the Carl & Thelma Casey Athletic Center, site of the football offices, training facilities, and stadium field house.

Prior to the building of the stadium, the Baylor football team played at Carroll Field, an on-campus field last used in 1935, and Waco's Municipal Stadium on Dutton Avenue.

In the spring of 2012, Baylor regents approved a new on-campus stadium to be built on the Brazos River adjacent to Interstate 35.

The demolition of the stadium was completed on May 14, 2016.

College football attendance records

References

Sports venues completed in 1950
Sports venues demolished in 2016
Baylor Bears football venues
Sports venues in Waco, Texas
American football venues in Texas
1950 establishments in Texas
2016 disestablishments in Texas
Demolished sports venues in Texas
Defunct college football venues